The Whole World Lit Up is the third studio album by Jewish rock band Blue Fringe. It was produced by C Lanzbom of Soulfarm, and was released by Rendezvous Music and Craig Taubman's Craig 'N' Co. label on February 1, 2007. The album combines traditional Hebrew prayers with English lyrics, as well as covers of songs by The Flaming Lips, Moshav, and Soulfarm.

Track listing

Personnel
Blue Fringe
Dov Rosenblatt - lead vocals, guitar, songwriting
Avi Hoffman - lead guitar
Hayyim Danzig - bass guitar
Danny Zwillenberg - drums

Other
C Lanzbom - producer, engineer, guitar, mixing, composer ("Listen to You")
Sean Altman - vocals
Alan Grubner - string arrangements, viola, violin
Christopher Hoffman - cello

References 

2007 albums
Blue Fringe albums